Roy Wright was the editor of British newspaper the Daily Express for seventeen months between 1976 and 1977. Wright had been promoted from a previous position as deputy editor at the Evening Standard. During his tenure, the Daily Express was converted from broadsheet to tabloid format. Shortly after the paper was purchased by Victor Matthews in June 1977, Wright was replaced with Derek Jameson.

References

Year of birth missing (living people)
Living people
British newspaper editors
Daily Express people